Baba Raul Canizares (24 September 1955 – 28 December 2002) was a Cuban Oba, a Santerían priest, an author, an artist, a musician, and a professor of religion who founded the Orisha Consciousness Movement.

Bibliography
 1999 - Cuban Santería: Walking With the Night (Ten Speed; Updated edition) 
 2000 - Shango : Santería and the Orisha of Thunder (Original Publications)  
 2000 - Obatala: Santería and the White Robed King of the Orisha (Original Publications) 
 2001 - The Life and Works of Marie LaVeau (Original Publications) 
 2001 - Eshu-Eleggua Elegbara: Santería and the Orisha of the Crossroads (Original Publications)  
 2002 - The Book on Palo (Original Publications) 
 2002 - Oshún: Santería and Orisha of Love, Rivers & Sensuality (Original Publications)

Discography

 2004 - Sacred Sounds of Santería: Rhythms of the Orishas - Music CD (Destiny Recordings; Abridged edition)  
 Sacred Sounds of Santería: Rhythms of the Orishas (Destiny Recordings)  (Cassette)
 2005 - Sacred Sounds of the Female Orishas: Rhythms of the Goddess (Destiny Recordings) - Music CD 
 Cuban Trance - Music CD

Obituary
 Dedication in Ashe Journal

References

2002 deaths
American Santeríans
American spiritual writers
American occult writers
1955 births